The 1956 Small Club World Cup was the fifth edition of the Small Club World Cup, a tournament held in Venezuela between 1952 and 1957, and in 1963 and in 1965. It was played by four participants, 3 from Europe and 1 from South America in double round robin format, and featured players like Alfredo Di Stéfano, Héctor Rial, Francisco Gento, Miguel Muñoz for Real Madrid, Uruguayan Alcides Ghiggia for Roma, Vavá for Vasco da Gama, Hernâni Silva, and Virgílio Mendes for Porto. This was Di Stéfano's second participation and trophy and his first with Real Madrid.

Real Madrid crowned champion of the competition, achieving their second Small World Cup trophy, while Argentine Alfredo Di Stéfano and Brazilians Vavá and Sabará, were the topscorers with 4 goals each.

Participants

Matches

Final standings

Topscorers

Champion

References

1956–57
1956 in South American football
1956 in Brazilian football
1956–57 in Portuguese football
1956–57 in Spanish football
1956–57 in Italian football
1956 in Venezuelan sport